Ana Dogon, or Ana Tiŋa, is a recently discovered Dogon language spoken in Mali. It was first reported online in 2005 by Roger Blench.

References

Further reading
 .

External links
Ana wordlist (Dendo and Blench, 2005)

Dogon languages
Languages of Mali